Events from the year 1542 in Sweden

Incumbents
 Monarch – Gustav I

Events

 - The rebellion Dacke War begins. 
 - Alliance between Sweden and France.

Births

 25 June - Magnus, Duke of Östergötland, (died 1595)

Deaths

References

 
Years of the 16th century in Sweden
Sweden